COMU can refer to:

Çomu, İskilip
Çanakkale Onsekiz Mart University
COMU, (1-Cyano-2-ethoxy-2-oxoethylidenaminooxy)dimethylamino-morpholino-carbenium hexafluorophosphate.  Amide coupling reagent.  COMU is a registered trademark of Luxembourg Bio Technologies, marketed as a safer and more effective replacement for benzotriazole-based uronium coupling reagents; see Peptide synthesis#Triazoles.